Yōko Maki (真木 よう子 Maki Yōko, born Yōko Kanamori on October 15, 1982) is a Japanese actress signed to Soyokaze. Maki has appeared in several films including the 2004 film Infection and the 2004 American horror film The Grudge.

Biography
Maki made her film debut at the age of 19 in the 2001 film Drug. Her film career took off when she received the role of Aya in The Princess Blade, a 2001 reimagining of the manga Lady Snowblood. Maki later began performing on stage in the 2002 play Cross. In November 2008, Maki announced that she had married a 26-year-old man not in the Japanese entertainment industry. She also announced that she was pregnant.

Filmography

Films

TV dramas

Direct-to-video films

Commercials
Lotte - Ao Toppo (2000)
JR East - Omiya Station version (2005)
Meiji Seika - Xylish (2005)
TBS and Dentsu - Green Film Project: everyday (2008)
Shiseido - Integrate (2008)
Lipton - The Royal (2008)

Other works

Music
 (2011) (Tokyo No. 1 Soul Set collaboration, on their album Subete Hikari)
"Saisakizaka" (2013) (single, produced by Ringo Sheena)

Photobooks
LIP (2003)
Gekkan Maki Yoko (2007)
Gekkan Maki Yoko Special (2008)

Anime
Michiko to Hatchin (2008–2009) – Michiko Malandro

Video game
Yakuza 6: The Song of Life (2016) – Kiyomi Kasahara

References

External links
Flying Box official profile 

1982 births
Japanese film actresses
Japanese television actresses
Japanese voice actresses
Living people
People from Inzai
Musicians from Chiba Prefecture
Voice actresses from Chiba Prefecture
20th-century Japanese actresses
21st-century Japanese actresses